Stenoptilia etcetera is a moth of the family Pterophoridae. It is found in Kyrgyzstan.

The wingspan is 12–13 mm. The forewings are dark brownish-grey. The hindwings and their fringes are dark brownish-grey.

References

Moths described in 1998
etcetera
Moths of Asia